Bap Teng Kang Waterfall is a waterfall in the city of Tawang in Arunachal Pradesh, India.

References

Waterfalls of Arunachal Pradesh
Environment of Arunachal Pradesh
Waterfalls of India